Scumbag can be:
A dysphemism for a base, despicable person; also a term of vulgar abuse
A condom, coarse slang (chiefly U.S.)
Scumbag (film), 2017 black comedy film by filmmaker Mars Roberge
"Scumbag" (song), a 2019 song by Goody Grace
"Scumbag", a song by John Lennon and Yoko Ono from Some Time in New York City
"Scumbag", a song by Green Day from Shenanigans

See also
Scumbag Hustler, film by Sean Weathers
My Self Scumbag, biographical novel based on Ivan Scumbag life
Scumbag Steve, Internet meme that became popular in 2006
Scumbug, mutant cockroach
Scuba (disambiguation)
Scum (disambiguation)
Sumba